The American Association of Colleges of Pharmacy (AACP) is the national organization representing the interests of pharmacy education. Founded in 1900, AACP comprises all accredited colleges and schools with pharmacy degree programs, including more than 6,400 faculty, 63,800 students enrolled in professional programs, and 4,800 individuals pursuing graduate study in the field of pharmacy.

The mission of AACP is to lead and partner with our members in advancing pharmacy education, research, scholarship, practice and service to improve societal health.

AACP provides member services – including meetings and events, webinars, continuing education, publications, reports and searchable directories for faculty, speakers and grants. AACP also works to promote the profession of pharmacy and the value of pharmacy education to audiences beyond the academic community.

References

External links
 AACP home page
 Official Publication The American Journal of Pharmaceutical Education

Organizations established in 1900
Pharmacy-related professional associations
Health industry trade groups based in the United States
College and university associations and consortia in the United States
Pharmacy organizations in the United States